Le Moutherot is a commune in the Doubs department in the Bourgogne-Franche-Comté region in eastern France.

Geography

On a top of a hill, the village offers a view on fields, forests. In bright weather Mont Blanc, the Mount Poupet, and the "Ballon of Alsace" can be seen.

Population

See also
 Communes of the Doubs department

References

External links

 Le Moutherot on the intercommunal Web site of the department 

Communes of Doubs